A legal relationship or legal relation is a legal connection between two persons or other entities. It may also be known, particularly in the law of India, as a jural relationship. A legal relationship may exist, for example, between two individuals or between an individual and a government. Legal relationships often imply rights and obligations. Examples of legal relationships include contracts, marriage, and citizenship. As with other fundamental legal concepts, many different ways of defining and classifying legal relationships have been put forward.

Being able to enter into legal relations is a defining characteristic of legal personhood. For example, prior to the abolition of coverture in the United States and United Kingdom, married women lacked the ability to enter into legal relations. The same was true of enslaved people under various forms of slavery, including in ancient Rome and the United States before 1865. The connection between legal personhood and the ability to enter into legal relations, or particularly the ability to have legal rights, first emerged in Renaissance humanism and was later developed by civil law scholars such as Carl von Savigny.

In the civil law tradition, the concept of a legal bond was used in the Institutes of Justinian to define an obligation as "a legal bond, with which we are bound by a necessity of performing some act according to the laws of our state." The metaphor of the "legal bond", also translated as "legal shackle" or "legal chain", remains fundamental to the law of obligations.

In common law jurisdictions, to create a contractual relationship, three elements are necessary: offer and acceptance, consideration and the intention to create legal relations. Because of this third requirement, an agreement may be unenforceable if a court believes that reasonable people would not have intended it to be legally binding, such as is often the case in social arrangements and domestic arrangements.

Theories

In the 19th century, the influential Pandectist legal theorist Carl von Savigny divided legal relationships into four categories: property, obligations, inheritance, and family law. Savigny thus included legal relations between persons and things, but did not consider the relations between persons and governments to be legal relations. Under Savigny's system, the question of choice of law became a question of which country was the seat of the relevant legal relationship. 

Savigny's legal theory, of which the theory of legal relations was a part, influenced not only the Continental legal tradition but British and American legal thought as well. Theories of legal relations, however, did not develop in English-speaking legal systems until the 20th century. 

German jurist Gustav Radbruch, writing in 1903, considered the correlative relationship between right and duty to be the "abstract legal relationship". In Radbruch's approach, a lowest-order legal relationship is, for example, a seller's right to the purchase price correlated to the buyer's duty to pay that price. The buyer's right to the goods and the seller's duty to deliver them complete these low-order legal relationships into the composite legal relationship of the sales contract, which in turn is included in the highest-level legal relationship of private law.

Working in the Marxist legal tradition, Soviet legal scholar Evgeny Pashukanis described capitalist society as "an endless chain of legal relationships." He rejected the idea of legal relationships being derived from law, arguing instead that legal relationships were derived from economic relationships, and that even public law ultimately derived its structure from economic relationships. Pashukanis contended that because legal relations arose from bourgeois capitalist material relations, it would be necessary to maintain them for some time under the New Economic Policy, but they would ultimately be replaced by the non-law of socialism. This position was influential in the 1920s but led to his condemnation in the Stalinist purge of 1937.

Hohfeldian analysis 

A systematic theory of legal relations was put forward by the US legal scholar Wesley Hohfeld in 1913 and remains widely influential. In Hohfeld's framework, there are four types of legal relations (or "jural correlatives"), between: right (or claim) and duty; privilege (or liberty) and no-right; power and liability; and immunity and disability. 

In each case, one person has the first position and another person has the second position. If someone has a "right" or "claim" under Hohfeld's system, someone else has a duty to act in accordance with that right. If someone has a "privilege", someone else has a "no-right", because they have no right (or claim) to prevent the first person from acting. For example, in contract litigation, if a plaintiff has failed to mitigate damages, the defendant gains a privilege not to pay those additional damages, and the plaintiff correspondingly has no claim to such damages. 

Likewise, someone with a power can change a legal relation of someone else, who has a liability. Someone with an immunity cannot have a given legal relation changed by someone else, and that second person has a disability. 

Although originally intended to describe legal relations in private law, Hohfeld's framework has been extended to constitutional law, notably by the German scholar Robert Alexy.

Characteristics of legal relations 

 Social relations arise only between people and their associations and are directly related to their activities and behavior.
 Ideological relations pass through the minds of people, where a model of future relations is formed because of existing universal values and social priorities.
 Legal relations act as a legal expression of economic, political, family, and other relations.
 Legal relations arise, cease or change based on legal norms that affect people's behavior and are implemented through it.
 The subjects of legal relations are interconnected by subjective rights and legal obligations. The parties in legal relations act as authorized and obligated persons, where the rights and interests of some persons can be realized through the performance of duties by others.
 The mutual behavior of participants in legal relations is individualized and clearly defined. The subjects of legal relations (government agencies, individuals, or legal entities), as a rule, are known in advance, their actions are coordinated before the beginning of these relations, which is not the case in other social relations.
 The volitional nature of legal relations is because they arise and are realized based on the will of at least one of their participants, necessarily passing through their consciousness and expressing their will.
 Legal relations are protected by the state.

Bibliography 
 Hart, H.L.A., 1961, The Concept of Law, chapter 3, Oxford: Clarendon Press.

References

Sociology of law
Law